The 2021–22 Polska Hokej Liga season was the 87th season of the Polska Hokej Liga, the top level of ice hockey in Poland. Nine teams participated in the league.

Teams

Regular season

Play-offs

Bracket

Quarterfinals

Semifinals

Third place

Finals

Final rankings

References

External links 
 Polish Ice Hockey Federation
 PHL
 Polska Hokej Liga on eliteprospects.com
 Polska Hokej Liga on eurohockey.com

Polska Hokej Liga seasons
Polska
Polska